No Substitutions: Live in Osaka is a live album by Larry Carlton and Steve Lukather, released in 2001 through Favored Nations. In 2002, the album won Carlton and Lukather, along with engineer/recorder Yoshiyasu Kumada and editor/producer Steve Vai, the Grammy Award for Best Pop Instrumental Album.

Track listing
 "The Pump" (Hymas, Phillips) – 14:28
 "Don't Give It Up" (Carlton) – 6:38
 "(It Was) Only Yesterday" (Carlton) – 12:09
 "All Blues" (Davis) – 14:06
 "Room 335" (Carlton) – 5:06

Personnel 
 Larry Carlton – guitar (left side)
 Rick Jackson – keyboards
 Steve Lukather – guitar (right side)
 Chris Kent – bass
 Gregg Bissonette – drums, percussion

Production 
 Steve Lukather – producer 
 Steve Vai – producer, mixing, editing 
 Yoshiyasu Kumada – recording 
 TakeshI Sasaki – recording assistant 
 Mark Dawson – second engineer  
 Neil Citron – mixing, editing
 The Mothership (Hollywood, California) – mixing location 
 The Harmony Hut (Encino, California) – mixing location 
 Ken Blaustein – art direction, art production, photography
 Gina Zangla – design, cover illustration 
 Robert Knight – photography 
 Kenju Uyama – photography 
 Fitzgerald Hartley Co. – management 
 Sonny Abelardo – album coordinator, sound mixer, tour manager 
 Ric "Reg" Britton – guitar technician, stage manager 
 Josh Henson – guitar technician, bass technician

References

2001 live albums
Larry Carlton albums
Steve Lukather albums
Favored Nations live albums
Grammy Award for Best Contemporary Instrumental Album